This is a list of adult fiction books that topped The New York Times Fiction Best Sellers list in 1944.

The most popular books of the year were A Tree Grows in Brooklyn, by Betty Smith and Strange Fruit, by Lillian Smith with respectively 22 and 15 weeks at the top. A "sleeper" success, A Tree Grows had been published fully 6 months before it eventually made it to the No. 1 spot. Somerset Maugham's mystical The Razor's Edge spent several weeks at No. 2, four times displacing Strange Fruit at No. 1.

See also
 Publishers Weekly list of bestselling novels in the United States in the 1940s

References

1944
.
1944 in the United States